Mário Lago OMC ( November 26, 1911 — May 30, 2002) was a Brazilian lawyer, poet, broadcaster, composer and actor.

Biography 

Lago was born in Rio de Janeiro, son of the maestro Antônio Lago and Francisca Maria Vicencia Croccia Lago, and grandson of the Italian anarchist and musician Giuseppe Croccia.

He graduated in Law the Universidade do Brasil, in 1933, getting involved in political activism,  and joining the Brazilian Communist Party, PCB. After graduation, Lago worked briefly as a lawyer.

Because of his political beliefs, Lago was imprisoned seven times - 1932, 1941, 1946, 1949, 1952, 1964 and 1969.

He married Zeli, daughter of the communist militant Henrique Cordeiro, until her death in 1997. The couple had five children: Antônio Henrique, Graça Maria, Mário Lago Filho, Luís Carlos (named after Luís Carlos Prestes) and Vanda. He was a supporter of Fluminense Football Club.

Artistic career 
Lago started on poetry with 15 years old, publishing a poem on the magazine "". He wrote revue plays and songs from 1933 to 1958, also acting in stage and radio plays, invited by fellow actor . With Braguinha, he wrote the screenplay for the 1939 film Banana da Terra, starring Carmen Miranda.

Three years later, Orlando Silva recorded Mario's song "Nada além".
His best known works were "Ai! que saudade da Amélia", "Atire a primeira pedra", in partnership with Ataulfo Alves; "É tão gostoso, seu moço", with Chocolate, "Número um", with Benedito Lacerda, the samba "Fracasso" and the carnival song "Aurora", with Roberto Roberti, recorded by Carmen Miranda.

In "Ai! que saudade da Amélia", the description of an idealized woman became so popular that "Amélia" became a synonym in Brazil for a submissive, resigned woman dedicated to housework.

Lago played on more than 30 films, among them The Priest and the Girl, Entranced Earth,  Os Herdeiros and S. Bernardo. He also acted in several telenovelas, most of them in TV Globo, like O Sheik de Agadir, Cavalo de Aço, O Casarão, and Dancing Days.

In 1989 Lago joined the Partido dos Trabalhadores, supporting Luiz Inácio Lula da Silva's presidential campaigns in 1989 and 1998.

Death 
He died on 30 May 2002, aged 90, on his house, in Rio de Janeiro South Zone. His funeral was on Teatro João Caetano, where he spent most of his career as an actor. Since his death, the theater of Colégio Pedro II is named as Teatro Mário Lago. He was buried in Cemitério de São João Batista, in Rio de Janeiro.

In 2001, in his honor the TV Globo program Domingão do Faustão created the Troféu Mário Lago, awarded to the best telenovela actor or actress.

Filmography

Television

Cinema

References

External links 
 Mário Lago's official website (in Portuguese)

Brazilian people of Italian descent
Brazilian Marxists
Brazilian atheists
Actors from Rio de Janeiro (state)
Brazilian composers
2002 deaths
1911 births